Las Piedras is a city in the Canelones Department of Uruguay. As of the census of 2011, it is the seventh most populated city of the country.

Las Piedras is also the name of the municipality to which the city belongs.

Geography
Bordering La Paz to the south and Montevideo to the southeast, it belongs to the wider metropolitan area of Montevideo. The stream Arroyo de las Piedras flows by the city.

Climate
The climate in this area is characterized by hot, humid summers and generally mild to cool winters.  According to the Köppen Climate Classification system, Las Piedras has a humid subtropical climate, abbreviated "Cfa" on climate maps.

History
Las Piedras was founded in 1744 under the name "San Isidro".

On May 18, 1811 the Uruguayan independence leader don José Gervasio Artigas led patriot forces to victory against Spain at the Battle of Las Piedras. While not the definitive event in the country's independence process, it marked a significant step towards the eventual establishment of an independent Uruguay.

It had acquired the status of "Pueblo" (village) before the Independence of Uruguay. Its status was elevated to "Ciudad" (city) on 15 May 1925 by the Act of Ley Nº 7.837.

Population
According to the 2011 census, Las Piedras had a population of 71,258. In 2010 the Intendencia de Canelones had estimated a population of 79,412 for the municipality during the elections.

 
Source: Instituto Nacional de Estadística de Uruguay

Places of worship
 Isidore the Laborer Parish Church (Roman Catholic, Salesians of Don Bosco)
 St. Adolph Parish Church in El Dorado (Roman Catholic)
 Our Lady of the Miraculous Medal Parish Church in San Isidro (Roman Catholic, Pilgrims of the Eucharist)
 St. Anthony of Padua Church in Pueblo Nuevo (Roman Catholic)

Sport
There is one professional association football team called Juventud de Las Piedras.

See also
 History of Uruguay#Struggle for independence, 1811-28

References

External links
INE map of Las Piedras

Gallery

 
Populated places in the Canelones Department
Populated places established in 1744
1744 establishments in the Spanish Empire